Dami Im is the second studio album by Dami Im, the winner of the fifth season of The X Factor Australia, released through Sony Music Australia on 15 November 2013. The album debuted at number one on the ARIA Albums Chart and was certified Platinum by the Australian Recording Industry Association for shipments of 70,000 copies. It was preceded by the lead single "Alive", which debuted at number one on the ARIA Singles Chart and was certified Platinum for selling 70,000 copies. Im became the first X Factor Australia contestant in ARIA Charts history to follow up a number one single with a number one album.

Commercial performance
Dami Im debuted at number one on the ARIA Albums Chart with 23,355 copies sold in its first week, becoming the first number-one album by an X Factor Australia contestant. It was certified Platinum by the Australian Recording Industry Association in its second week for shipments of 70,000 copies.
As of 2013, the album has sold 78,000 in Australia.

Track listing

Charts

Weekly charts

Year-end charts

Certifications

Release history

See also
List of number-one albums of 2013 (Australia)

References

2013 albums
Dami Im albums
Sony Music Australia albums
Albums produced by DNA Songs